Gregor Trinkaus-Randall (1946-2019) was an American archivist and preservationist who served as the 67th President of the Society of American Archivists (SAA). He was also known as a leader in the library and archives preservation community in Massachusetts.

Life
Trinkaus-Randall was born in Boston, Massachusetts in 1946 and attended Deerfield Academy. He then studied at the University of Wisconsin–Madison (UWM), receiving a bachelor's degree in history and French in 1968, and a master's degree in African history in 1973. After graduation he taught high school courses at Virginia Academy and the Beaver Country Day School before returning to UWM to pursue an MALS degree in library science and archival administration under F. Gerald Ham.

After completing his degree, Trinkaus-Randall began his career as an archivist at the USS Constitution Museum and the Computer Museum before moving to the Peabody Museum of Salem. In 1988 he became the preservation specialist for the Massachusetts Board of Library Commissioners, where he remained until his retirement in 2018. In this position he coordinated emergency response planning for cultural heritage institutions throughout the state, as well as other preservation activities.

Trinkaus-Randall was also involved with a number of professional associations related to archival work, including the New England Archivists (NEA) and the Society of American Archivists. He served as president of the New England Archivists between 1995 and 1996, and was president of the Society of American Archivists from 2011 to 2012. In 2017 he became president-elect of the Academy of Certified Archivists (ACA), though he later had to resign due to his declining health. He was also the recipient of the NEA Distinguished Service Award and the ACA Distinguished Service Award. He was elected an SAA Fellow in 2006.

Death
Trinkaus-Randall died on August 16, 2019.

Works
 Protecting Your Collections: A Manual of Archival Security (Chicago: Society of American Archivists, 1995)
 "The Good, the Bad, and the Ugly: The Archival Profession and Future Challenges," American Archivist 76, no. 1 (Spring/Summer 2013): 10-18
 "The USA PATRIOT Act: Archival Implications," Journal of Archival Organization 3, no. 4 (2006): 7-23
 "Library and Archival Security: Policies and Procedures to Protect Holdings from Theft and Damage," Journal of Library Administration 25, no. 1 (1998): 91-112

References

1946 births
2019 deaths
American archivists
University of Wisconsin–Madison College of Letters and Science alumni
Deerfield Academy alumni
People from Boston
Presidents of the Society of American Archivists